Scicolone is a surname of Italian origin. Notable people with the surname include:

 Maria Scicolone (born 1938), Italian television personality, columnist, and singer
 Sofia Villani Scicolone (born 1934), Italian actress

Surnames of Italian origin